

Bluff Beach is a locality in the Australian state  of South Australia located on the west coast of Yorke Peninsula overlooking Hardwicke Bay about  west of the state capital of Adelaide.

Its boundaries were created in May 1999 for the “long established name” and includes the former Bluff Beach Shack Site from which the locality’s name was derived.

As of 2015, the majority land use within the locality is agriculture.  A secondary land use is conservation which concerns the strip of land immediately adjoining the coastline.  A third use of land is residential use along the coastline at the site of the former shack site.

The 2016 Australian census which was conducted in August 2016 reports that Bluff Beach had a population of 31 people.

Bluff Beach is located within the federal division of Grey, the state electoral district of Narungga and the local government area of the Yorke Peninsula Council.

See also
Brown Point

References

Towns in South Australia
Yorke Peninsula
Spencer Gulf